The New Artsakh Alliance is an Armenian political alliance in Artsakh.

History
The New Artsakh Alliance was established on 29 January, 2020 during a conference in Stepanakert.

The political alliance consists of several liberal parties; supporting the independent presidential candidacy of Artsakh foreign minister Masis Mayilyan. The alliance consists of the Artsakh of Tomorrow Party, the Identity and Unity Party, and the Ramkavar Liberal Party of Artsakh. The administrative bodies of the three political parties reaffirmed the stances of their respective parties and had pledged their support to Masis Mayilyan in the 2020 Artsakhian general election. In return, Mayilyan expressed his deep gratitude to the three political parties for their support and stressed that if elected, he would implement radical reform programs to benefit Artsakh. Meanwhile, the Powerful United Homeland Party endorsed the New Artsakh Alliance.

Prior to the election, Masis Mayilyan as well as representatives of the alliance announced that they would cease all campaigning and shut down the party's headquarters due to health and safety concerns from the ongoing COVID-19 pandemic.

Ideology
The party's principle ideology is liberalism. Party leaders advocated for the government of Artsakh to tackle the internal and external challenges facing the country, the improvement of public life and to protect democracy and civil rights of citizens' within the state.

Electoral record
Following the 2020 election, the alliance gained just 4.60% of the votes after the first round of voting. The alliance failed to gain any seats in the National Assembly. Following the election, the alliance released a statement criticizing the decision to allow the election to go ahead during a global pandemic. The alliance also stated that serious violations were registered during the national elections which influenced the free will of citizens. Currently, the alliance acts as an extra-parliamentary force.

See also

List of political parties in Artsakh
Politics of Artsakh

References

Political parties in the Republic of Artsakh
Political parties established in 2020